Oreobates madidi is a species of frog in the family Strabomantidae. It is endemic to Bolivia. Its natural habitat is subtropical or tropical moist montane forest.

References

madidi
Amphibians of Bolivia
Endemic fauna of Bolivia
Taxonomy articles created by Polbot
Amphibians described in 2005